Mauricio Alberto Sabillón Peña (born 11 November 1978) is a former Honduran football player who last played for Marathón.

He has been on the Honduras national football team since 2001.

Club career
Sabillón began his career with Marathón in 1999 and remained at the club for more than ten years and was viewed as one of the team's top players. While with Marathón, the technically skilled Sabillón played primarily as a right back. During his decade with  Marathón, they enjoyed the greatest period in its history capturing six domestic titles during that time.

China
His play with Marathón drew the interest of Chinese club Hangzhou Greentown whom he joined in 2010. In his one season with Hangzhou Sabillón appeared in 24 league matches helping the club to a fourth-place finish and qualification to the 2011 AFC Champions League Group stage. After one season in China Sabillón returned to Marathón.

On January 27, 2011 Sabillón confirmed that he received an offer from Major League Soccer side New York Red Bulls, but a deal had to be agreed to with Marathón as he has a year remaining on his contract.

International career
Sabillón made his debut for Honduras in a May 2001 UNCAF Nations Cup match against Panama and has earned a total of 49 caps, scoring no goals. He has represented his country in 14 FIFA World Cup qualification matches and played at the 2001 and 2011 UNCAF Nations Cups as well as at the 2011 CONCACAF Gold Cup.

He helped Honduras qualify for the 2010 World Cup. There was speculation that his move to Hangzhou Greentown could jeopardize his selection  to the World Cup squad, however coach Reinaldo Rueda included Sabillón in the 23 man squad. He made his World Cup debut on June 25, 2010 in a 0-0 draw with Switzerland going the full 90.

Honours

Club
  C.D. Marathón
 Liga Nacional de Fútbol de Honduras (6): 2001-02 Clausura, 2002-03 Clausura, 2004-05 Apertura, 2007-08 Apertura, 2008-09 Apertura, 2009-10 Apertura
 Runners Up (6): 2001-02 Apertura, 2003-04 Clausura, 2004-05 Clausura, 2005-06 Apertura, 2006-07 Clausura, 2007-08 Clausura.

References

External links

1978 births
Living people
People from Santa Bárbara Department, Honduras
Association football defenders
Honduran footballers
Honduras international footballers
Liga Nacional de Fútbol Profesional de Honduras players
2001 UNCAF Nations Cup players
2010 FIFA World Cup players
2011 Copa Centroamericana players
2011 CONCACAF Gold Cup players
C.D. Marathón players
Expatriate footballers in China
Zhejiang Professional F.C. players
Honduran expatriates in China
Chinese Super League players
Copa Centroamericana-winning players